Utah Territory's at-large congressional district is an obsolete congressional district that encompassed the area of the Utah Territory. After Utah's admission to the Union as the 45th state by act of Congress on January 4, 1896, this district was dissolved and replaced by Utah's at-large congressional district.

List of delegates representing the district 
On September 9, 1850, an act of Congress gave Utah Territory the authority to elect a congressional delegate, though the first delegate did not take his seat until 1851. The territorial delegates were elected to two-year terms. Delegates were allowed to serve on committees, debate, and submit legislation, but were not permitted to vote on bills.

Notes

References
General
 
 
 
Specific

Former congressional districts of the United States
At-large United States congressional districts
Territory At-large
Constituencies established in 1850
Constituencies disestablished in 1896
1850 establishments in Utah Territory
1896 disestablishments in Utah Territory